Terry Farnsworth (born 27 August 1942) is a Canadian former Olympic judoka. He won a Canadian national judo championship in 1972 and 1973, competed at the 1972 Summer Olympics, and won a gold medal at the 1969 Maccabiah Games and a silver medal at the 1973 Maccabiah Games in Israel.

Biography

Farnsworth was born in Portland, Maine, and is Jewish. He graduated high school and attended two years of a pre-college program in Canada, and then lived in Roppongi, Tokyo, Japan, from the ages of 20 to 26 years old. There, he studied at Chuo University. He has lived in Bois-des-Filion, Canada.

Judo career
Farnsworth earned a black belt in judo in Montreal, and then moved to Tokyo to practice judo. 

At the 1969 Maccabiah Games in Israel, Farnsworth won a gold medal in the light-heavyweight class. He won the 1972 Canadian Championships U-93 in Halifax, Canada.

Farnsworth competed in the men's half-heavyweight event at the 1972 Summer Olympics, coming in 7th. He defeated Imre Varga (Hungary) and José Ibáñez Gómez (Cuba), but lost to eventual bronze medal winner Paul Barth (Germany) and European Judo Champion Helmut Howiller (Germany).

He described his experience during the Munich Massacre at the 1972 Olympics by members of the Palestinian terrorist group Black September, who had infiltrated the Olympic Village:

I was 50 feet away. I saw ... the Arab with the mask, standing on the balcony. I saw the guy. I mean, we had to run underneath where the Israelis were, and one of my buddies had an Israeli friend, went to visit him, and he came back at 1:30 in the morning, and the terrorists came in at about 3:00. So he was an hour and a half away from being dead himself. That was horrible. We were 50 feet away from the whole thing. One interesting story was, separating us was the Korean housing, and when it first happened, I walked down to the Korean apartments, and I saw the door open in one apartment. I see a Korean guy sitting in the window with his rifle, facing the Arabs or where the Israelis were held. He told me he was an ex-American Marine, but he was a Korean citizen. He was on the rifle team. He said, “I’m going to get one of those f*cking Arabs!” ... But they came and took his rifle away! 

Farnsworth won the 1973 Canadian Championships U-93 in Whitehorse, Canada. 

At the 1973 Maccabiah Games in Israel, Farnsworth was the flag carrier for Team Canada. He won a silver medal in the light-heavyweight competition, losing in the finals to American Olympian Irwin Cohen.

Film career
Farnsworth had roles in a few movies, including a small part in Walk, Don't Run (1966), an American comedy starring Cary Grant, and a part in The Drifting Avenger (1968), a Japanese Western film shot in Australia. He also acted in the Japanese tokusatsu science fiction television series Ultraseven (1967-68).

References

External links
 

1942 births
Living people
Canadian male judoka
Chuo University alumni
Competitors at the 1969 Maccabiah Games
Competitors at the 1973 Maccabiah Games
Jewish martial artists
Jewish Canadian sportspeople
Jews from Quebec
Judoka at the 1972 Summer Olympics
Maccabiah Games medalists in judo
Maccabiah Games gold medalists for Canada
Maccabiah Games silver medalists for Canada
Male actors from Portland, Maine
Olympic judoka of Canada
People from Minato
Sportspeople from Portland, Maine
Sportspeople from Quebec
20th-century Canadian people
21st-century Canadian people